Han Yingying (born April 20, 1986) is a female Chinese Taekwondo practitioner.

References
 Profile from The-Sports.org

External links

1986 births
Living people
Chinese female taekwondo practitioners
Universiade medalists in taekwondo
Universiade silver medalists for China
World Taekwondo Championships medalists
Asian Taekwondo Championships medalists
Medalists at the 2009 Summer Universiade
21st-century Chinese women